Graphium leechi is a species of butterfly from the family Papilionidae that is found in China and Vietnam. Very little is known about this species.

Subspecies
 G. l. leechi
 G. l. yunnana C.L. Lee, 1985
 G. l. aprilis (gen. vernalis) Bang-Haas, 1934

References

External links
Butterfly corner Images from Naturhistorisches Museum Wien
Global Butterfly Information System Images, type details

leechi
Butterflies of Indochina
Butterflies of Asia
Insects of Vietnam
Butterflies described in 1895